Hazlehurst is a city in and the county seat of Copiah County, Mississippi, United States, located about  south of the state capital Jackson along Interstate 55. The population was 4,009 at the 2010 census. It is part of the Jackson Metropolitan Statistical Area. Its economy is based on agriculture, particularly tomatoes and cabbage.

History

The first settlement here by European Americans became known as the town of Gallatin; two lawyers and brothers-in-law named Walters and Saunders came from Gallatin, Tennessee, in 1819 and named the village after their hometown. They built their homes on the banks of the Bayou Pierre, in the western part of Copiah County. Other settlers came with them, and in 1829 the state legislature incorporated the town. The first decades of agriculture  The incorporation charter was repealed on January 18, 1862.

The construction of the New Orleans, Jackson and Great Northern Railroad began on November 3, 1865, stimulating development of Hazlehurst at the railway stop. It was named for Col. George H. Hazlehurst, an engineer for the new railroad. A city in Georgia is also named for him.

As Hazlehurst grew, Gallatin declined into a settlement at a crossroads. In April 1872, the legislature ordered the county board of supervisors to hold an election to decide whether the county seat should be moved from Gallatin to Hazlehurst. After a majority voted for the change, Gallatin's old brick courthouse was torn down and reassembled in Hazlehurst

This city had civil rights activity during the mid-1960s. Because of violence against blacks in this area, Mississippi, the armed Deacons for Defense and Justice established centers here and in nearby Crystal Springs in 1966 and 1967. They provided physical protection for protesters working with the NAACP on a commercial boycott of white merchants to force integration of facilities and employment, and to gain jobs for African Americans following passage of civil rights legislation in 1964.

On January 23, 1969, an F4 tornado devastated the south side of Hazlehurst, killing 11 people in town and damaging or destroying 175 homes.

Geography
Hazlehurst is located slightly east of the center of Copiah County. U.S. Route 51 passes through the center of the city, leading north  to Crystal Springs and south  to Brookhaven. Interstate 55 runs west of and generally parallel to US 51, with access to Hazlehurst from exits 59 and 61. Mississippi Highway 28 crosses US 51 and I-55 in the northern part of town, leading east  to Georgetown and west  to Fayette.

Demographics

2020 census

As of the 2020 United States census, there were 3,619 people, 1,108 households, and 743 families residing in the city.

2000 census
As of the census of 2000, there were 4,400 people, 1,594 households, and 1,131 families residing in the city. The population density was 1,004.9 people per square mile (387.9/km2). There were 1,752 housing units at an average density of 400.2 per square mile (154.4/km2). The racial makeup of the city was 29.30% White, 68.59% African American, 0.02% Native American, 0.48% Asian, 0.59% from other races, and 1.02% from two or more races. Hispanic or Latino of any race were 2.05% of the population.

There were 1,594 households, out of which 34.3% had children under the age of 18 living with them, 36.5% were married couples living together, 28.0% had a female householder with no husband present, and 29.0% were non-families. 26.6% of all households were made up of individuals, and 13.4% had someone living alone who was 65 years of age or older. The average household size was 2.68 and the average family size was 3.20.

In the city, the population was spread out, with 28.1% under the age of 18, 10.4% from 18 to 24, 25.6% from 25 to 44, 19.9% from 45 to 64, and 16.0% who were 65 years of age or older. The median age was 35 years. For every 100 females, there were 82.7 males. For every 100 females age 18 and over, there were 76.3 males.

The median income for a household in the city was $25,008, and the median income for a family was $26,081. Males had a median income of $27,066 versus $19,475 for females. The per capita income for the city was $11,839. About 24.0% of families and 26.3% of the population were below the poverty line, including 35.8% of those under age 18 and 26.7% of those age 65 or over.

Education
The city is served by the Hazlehurst City School District. The Copiah-Jefferson Regional Library main offices are in Hazlehurst, as well as the main office of Copiah County School District.

Infrastructure

Rail transportation

Amtrak, the national passenger rail system, provides service to Hazlehurst. Amtrak Train 59, the southbound City of New Orleans, is scheduled to depart Hazlehurst at 11:55 am daily with service to Brookhaven, McComb, Hammond, and New Orleans. Amtrak Train 58, the northbound City of New Orleans, is scheduled to depart Hazlehurst at 4:17 pm daily with service to Jackson, Yazoo City, Greenwood, Memphis, Newbern-Dyersburg, Fulton, Carbondale, Centralia, Effingham, Mattoon, Champaign-Urbana, Kankakee, Homewood, and Chicago.

Notable people
Joe Bailey (1863-1929), an attorney and US Senator from Texas, lived and worked in Hazlehurst before moving.
 Houston Boines, blues singer and harmonica player
 Alvin Chester Cockrell Jr.; awarded a Navy Cross in World War II
 Max Dale Cooper, immunologist and Professor of Pathology at Emory University known for identifying T cells and B cells
 Clifford Davis, U.S. Representative from Tennessee from 1940 to 1965
 Mablean Ephriam, adjudicator of the courtroom series Divorce Court for seven seasons from the 1999–2006 season
 John Epperson, actor and singer best known for his performance as Lypsinka; born in Hazlehurst
 Robert Evans, member of the Mississippi House of Representatives
 Ron Franklin, sportscaster
 Ben Garry, NFL player
 Beth Henley, playwright, was born in Jackson but spent much of her childhood here, as it was where her father grew up. Her Pulitzer Prize-winning play, Crimes of the Heart, is set in Hazlehurst.
 William Hester, tennis player and official. Former president of the United States Tennis Association.
 Roy Hilton, former professional football defensive end
 Gregory Holloway Sr., member of the Mississippi House of Representatives
 Ruth Atkinson Holmes, painter and philanthropist
 Robert Johnson, the Delta blues musician, was born in Hazlehurst. A monument to him was installed between the Copiah County courthouse and the Trustmark Bank. Johnson's birth home is located near the courthouse; the City of Hazlehurst is in litigation to determine its future.
 Rory Lee, pastor of Antioch Baptist Church in Hazlehurst from 1976 to 1994; president of two Southern Baptist colleges
 Print Matthews, former sheriff of Copiah County
 Benjamin Morgan Palmer, 19th-century Presbyterian minister, made Hazlehurst his family's home in the summer of 1862 as he served as chaplain with the Washington Artillery of New Orleans.
 Lawrence Pillers, former professional football defensive end
 Mary Tillman Smith, outsider artist
 Truett Smith, former professional football blocking back
 Lewis Tillman, professional football player
 Walter Washington, former president of Alcorn State University and Alpha Phi Alpha
 H. Lynn Womack, publisher

References

External links

City of Hazelhurst Government Portal
Map of Mississippi from 1836 showing the location of Gallatin in Copiah County

Cities in Mississippi
Cities in Copiah County, Mississippi
County seats in Mississippi
Cities in Jackson metropolitan area, Mississippi